Saison is a type of beer.

Saison may also refer to:
Saison (restaurant)
 Ella May Saison
 Credit Saison
 Saison River
 The Hunting Season